Neathyrma is a monotypic moth genus of the family Erebidae erected by George Hampson in 1926. Its only species, Neathyrma iridescens, was first described by Paul Dognin in 1914. It is found in Colombia.

References

Calpinae
Monotypic moth genera